Kaplan IT Training, formerly Transcender provides IT (information technology) certification practice exams, practice labs, and online learning courses. Kaplan IT Training offers test preparation solutions that are used by IT professionals to improve their technical skills and prepare for industry certification exams, including:
 Microsoft
 Cisco
 CompTIA
 Oracle
 ITIL
 (ISC)2
 PMI (Project Management Institute)
 EC-Council
 Adobe
 Axelos
 GIAC
 ISACA
 Logical Operations
 LPI
 VMware
 Juniper Networks
 Amazon Web Services
Kaplan IT Trainings's products are used by certified training and education centers, college and university students, and IT staff members at many large corporations.

Company

Transcender was established in 1992, shortly after Microsoft Corporation introduced its certification program. In December 2003, Transcender joined Kaplan IT Learning and became a division of Kaplan, Inc. Kaplan is a wholly owned subsidiary of Graham Holdings Company (NYSE: GHC), formerly known as The Washington Post Company, and is a provider of online higher education, K-12 services, and professional training programs. Kaplan was founded by Stanley H. Kaplan, an American businessman who is recognized as a pioneer of scholastic test preparation. In 2017, Transcender became known as Transcender, powered by Kaplan IT Training.

Certification Preparation Products

Kaplan IT Training's IT certification preparation solutions reinforce learning objectives and validate knowledge to help students prepare for their certification exams. Products include:
 Exam simulations
 Flashcards
 Skillsoft eLearning
 Practice Labs
 GMetrix exam preparation
Kaplan IT Training relies on a team of IT-certified subject matter experts, technical writers, and technical editors to create and edit its practice exam items, explanations, and references. Each test preparation product goes through a rigorous, multi-stage editing process to ensure complete coverage of exam objectives.

Awards

Since its inception, Kaplan IT Training, formerly Transcender, has received several industry awards. The company's most recent accolades include:
 Windows IT Pro: Editor's Best Training, 2008
 Redmond Magazine: Best Exam Preparation Product or Service, 2007, 2006, 2005
 Windows IT Pro: Best Computer-Based Training, 2006 (Reader's Choice)
 CertCities.com: Best Practice Exams, 2005, 2004, 2003, 2002
 asp.netPRO: Best Training, 2004 (Reader's Choice)
 Windows Server System Magazine: Best Product for Training and Certification, 2004
 Microsoft Certified Professional Magazine: Best Exam Preparation Product, 2004

External links
 Official Website

References

 

Educational software companies